Lonely Hearts, Lonelyhearts or Lonely Heart may refer to:

Journalism
Lonely hearts columns, personal advertisements
Lonely hearts killer, a person who commits murder by contacting a victim via newspaper classified ads

People
 The "Lonely Hearts Killers", Raymond Fernandez and Martha Beck, an American serial killer couple who met their unsuspecting victims through lonely hearts ads

Entertainment and media

Film
Miss Lonelyhearts, the name of Judith Evelyn's character in Alfred Hitchcock's 1954 film Rear Window
Lonelyhearts, a 1958 American drama film starring Montgomery Clift
Lonely Hearts (1970 film), a 1970 Italian romantic drama film
Lonely Hearts (1982 film), an Australian drama film
Lonely Heart (film), a 1985 Japanese film directed by Nobuhiko Obayashi
Lonely Hearts (1991 film), an American film starring Eric Roberts 
Lonely Hearts (2006 film), an American film starring John Travolta, based on "The Lonely Hearts Killers", Fernandez and Beck
Lonely Hearts, a 2007 UK short film starring Martin Freeman

Literature
Miss Lonelyhearts, a 1933 novel by Nathanael West

Music
The Lonely Hearts, a band from Nashville, Tennessee
The Lonelyhearts, an American band
Lonely Heart (album), a 2007 album by Massacre
"Lonely Heart" (Tammy Wynette song), 1984
 "Lonely Heart", a song by Irving Berlin
 "Lonely Hearts" (JoJo song), 2020
 "Lonely Hearts" (Miliyah Kato song), 2013
 "Lonely Heart" a 2020 song by 5 Seconds of Summer

Television
"Lonely Heart" (Angel), the second episode of the television show Angel
"Lonely Hearts", a season 4 episode of the television show Cold Case
"Lonelyhearts" (Grimm), the fourth episode in the first season of Grimm

See also
Sgt. Pepper's Lonely Hearts Club Band, the eighth studio album by the English rock band The Beatles
Dear Lonely Hearts, a 1962 album by Nat King Cole
 "Lonely Hearts Club", a song by Marina and the Diamonds from Electra Heart
Lonely Hearts Club (disambiguation)